This is a list of notable people from Himachal Pradesh, India.

Arts
 Baba Kanshi Ram - poet and independence activist
 Chandradhar Sharma Guleri - writer and scholar
 Gambhari Devi - folk singer and folklorist
 Gautam Chand Sharma 'Vyathit' - folklorist, poet, writer
 H.R. Harnot - writer
 Nainsukh - painter of Kangra school of painting
 Nirmal Verma - writer
 Ram Kumar - painter
 Shriniwas Joshi - writer and theatre artist
 Vijay Sharma - painter and art historian

Business 
 M S Banga

Defence

Awardess of the Param Vir Chakra and equivalent awards 

Major Som Nath Sharma - the first Param Vir Chakra awardee ever (1950)
Lieutenant Colonel Dhan Singh Thapa - Param Vir Chakra awardee (1962) 
 Captain Vikram Batra - Param Vir Chakra awardee (1999)
 Rifleman Sanjay Kumar - Param Vir Chakra awardee (1999)
 Major Sudhir Kumar Walia - Ashoka Chakra awardee (1999)
 Jemadar Lala, Victoria Cross awardee (1916) 
 Honorary Captain Bhandari Ram - Victoria Cross awardee (1945)

Other notable defence personnel 

 Major General Siri Kanth Korla, PVSM, DSO, MC - decorated WWII and Indo-Pak War (1965) veteran
 Major General Anant Singh Pathania, MVC, MC - decorated WWII and Indo-Pak War (1947-49) veteran
 Brigadier Sher Jung Thapa, MVC - 'The Hero of Skardu' in the Indo-Pak War (1947-49)
 Lieutenant General Ranjit Singh Dyal, PVSM, MVC - Indo-Pak War (1965) veteran
 Brigadier Rattan Nath Sharma, MVC - decorated Indo-Pak War (1965) and Indo-Pak War (1971) veteran
 Group Captain Virendera Singh Pathania VrC, Vayusena Medal - first IAF pilot to make a confirmed kill of a Pakistani jet in independent India; veteran of the 1962, 1965, and 1971 wars
 General Vishwa Nath Sharma, PVSM, AVSM, ADC - 14th Chief of the Army Staff in the Indian Army (1988-1990)
 Lt. Saurabh Kalia - PoW in the Kargil War (1999)
 Subedar Major and Honorary Captain Chhering Norbu Bodh, SC - Mountaineer (1990s-2000s)

Historians 
 Bipan Chandra
 Chetan Singh
 Hari Sen
 Mian Goverdhan Singh
 Om Chand Handa
 Raaja Bhasin 
 Tobdan
 Tshering Dorje

Judicial 
 Mehr Chand Mahajan
 Deepak Gupta (judge)
 Lokeshwar Singh Panta
 Abhilasha Kumari
 Sanjay Karol

Entertainment and Television 
 Adarsh Rathore - journalist, singer
Anuj Sharma - singer
 Anupam Kher - film actor
 Ashish R Mohan - film director
 Asmita Sood - television actress
 B. R. Ishara- film director and script writer
Kangana Ranawat - Bollywood actress
 Manohar Singh - theatre and film actor
 Mohit Chauhan - Bollywood singer
 Neeraj Sood - Film Actor
 Preity Zinta - film actress
 Prem Chopra - Bollywood Actor
 Priya Rajvansh - film actress
 Purva Rana - model
 Ravi Bhatia - television actor
 Rubina Dilaik - television actress
 Savi Thakur - Television actor
 Shipra Khanna - chef
 Shivya Pathania - television actress
 Shriya Sharma - film actress
 Siddharth Chauhan - screenwriter, director, and producer
 Vishal Karwal - television actor
 Yami Gautam - film actress

Politicians

Chief ministers 

 Yashwant Singh Parmar, the founder of the Himachal Pradesh state and its first chief minister (1952-1956; 1963-1977)
 Thakur Ram Lal (1977; 1980-1983) 
 Shanta Kumar (1977-1980; 1990-1992) 
 Virbhadra Singh (1983-1985; 1985-1990; 1993-1998; 2003-2007; 2012-2017)
 Prem Kumar Dhumal (1998-2003; 2008-2012)
 Jai Ram Thakur (2017-2022)
 Sukhvinder Singh Sukhu (2022–present)

Other politicians from Himachal Pradesh 
Anand Sharma
Anurag Thakur
Asha Kumari
Brij Behari Lal Butail
Chander Kumar
G. S. Bali
Jai Bihari Lal Khachi 
Jagat Prakash Nadda
Jagdev Chand Thakur
Kaul Singh Thakur
Khimi ram
Kishan Kapoor
Lata Thakur
Mahender Singh
Mukesh Agnihotri
Phunchog Rai
Pratibha Singh
Satpal Singh Satti
Sukh Ram
Thakur Sen Negi
Vidya Stokes

Himachalis outside India
 Gaurav Sharma (politician) - medical doctor and MP in New Zealand
 Jay Chaudhry - CEO and founder of Zscaler a Nasdaq listed company in USA

Science and Education 
 Padma Shri Dr Randeep Guleria - Director AIIMS New Delhi and Professor and Head Department of Pulmonary Disease and Sleeping Disorders
 Padma Shri Dr Jagat Ram - Ophthalmologist and Director PGI Chandigarh
 Padma Shri Dr Mahesh Verma - Vice Chancellor Guru Gobind Singh Indraprastha University
 Padma Shri Dr D.S. Rana - Nephrologist and Chairman, Board of Management, Sir Ganga Ram Hospital (India) New Delhi
 Arvind Mohan Kayastha - Biologist
 Anand Mohan - Geologist, Petrologist
 R.C. Sawhney - Scientist, Professor
 T. R. Sharma - Plant Biologist, Educator
 Vijay Kumar Thakur - Engineer and Nano-technologist
 Omesh Kumar Bharti -
 Padma Shri Dr Jagdev Guleria
 Munmun Dhalaria - documentary filmmaker
 Bittu Sehgal - nature conservationist and writer

Sports 
 Ajay Thakur - kabaddi player
 Ashish Kumar - silver medalist in Asian Games in boxing 2019
 Charanjit Singh - hockey (1964 Olympics)
 Chuni Lal Thakur - Winter Olympian
 Deepak Thakur - hockey
 Dicky Dolma - Mountaineer
 Hira Lal - Winter Olympian
 Manavjit Singh Sandhu - sports shooter
 Manvinder Bisla - cricketer
 Nanak Chand Thakur- Winter Olympian
 Paras Dogra - cricketer
 Renuka Singh - cricketer (India women's national cricket team)
 Rishi Dhawan - cricketer
 Samaresh Jung - sports shooter
 Shiva Keshavan - luge (Winter Olympian)
 Skalzang Dorje - Archery (1996 Olympics)
 Suman Rawat - Track and field athlete
 Sushma Verma - cricketer (India women's national cricket team)
 The Great Khali - wrestler
 Vijay Kumar - sports shooter

Religion 
 Khunu Lama Tenzin Gyaltsen - Buddhist teacher and scholar
 Thakur Ram Singh - RSS and Akhil Bharatiya Itihas Sankalan

Non-Himachalis with significant contributions to HP 
Amrita Sher-Gil - painter
Bhabesh Chandra Sanyal - painter
Brijinder Nath Goswamy - art historian
Didi Contractor - architect
Harish Kapadia - mountaineer and writer
Helena Roerich - philosopher and explorer
Kirin Narayan - anthropologist
Manohar Singh Gill - administrator, politician, and writer
Mohan Singh Oberoi - hotelier
Mohinder Singh Randhawa - art historian
Norah Richards - theatre
Nicholas Roerich - painter, philosopher, explorer
Penelope Chetwode - travel writer
Rahul Sankrityayan - scholar and travel writer
Samuel Bourne - early photographer
Satyananda Stokes - orchardist
Sobha Singh - painter
Svetsolav Roerich - painter
Tenzin Gyatso - the fourteenth Dalai Lama
Tenzin Palmo - Buddhist nun and activist
Timothy A. Gonsalves - academician, entrepreneur
Yeshi Dhonden - Sowa Rigpa doctor

Miscellaneous
 Sansar Chand - ruler of Kangra in the 18th and early 19th centuries
 Kinkri Devi - activist and environmentalist
 Shyam Saran Negi - India's first voter
 Zorawar Singh Kahluria - general of the Dogra army in the first half of the 19th century
 Narain Chand Parashar - linguist, cultural historian, and politician
 Pelden Gyeltshen - the 40th Ganden Tripa (17th century)

References

External links
Prominent Personalities Of Himachal

Himachal Pradesh

People